The Russell City Energy Center (RCEC) is a 619-megawatt natural gas-fired power station, which began operating in August 2013. It is operated by Calpine, and is located in Hayward, California. It is named for Russell City and is built on that community's former landfill site.

History
In 2001, the Calpine energy corporation developed plans to build a 619 megawatt power plant, the Russell City Energy Center, at the city's former location. The plant broke ground in late 2010. The plant borders the City of Hayward Waste Water Pollution Control Facility and property owned by East Bay Discharge Authority near the Don Edwards San Francisco Bay National Wildlife Refuge and the Hayward Regional Shoreline.

The Russell City Energy Center is the nation’s first power plant to receive a federal air permit that includes a voluntary limit on greenhouse gas emissions. A Federal Appeals Court, in May 2012, denied an environmental claim by nearby Chabot College. The plant went online in August 2013, and its full output of electricity is sold to Pacific Gas and Electric Company under a 10-year contract. Calpine Corporation owns 75% of the plant's peak dispatchable capacity, or 464 megawatts, and GE Energy Financial Services owns the balance.

On May 27 2021 an explosion at the plant shut down energy production. The city of Hayward is opposing the reopening until more is known about the cause.

Design and specifications
The power train consists of two Siemens Westinghouse 501 FD Phase 2 combustion turbine generators (CTG), each  maximum and each followed by a heat recovery steam generator (HRSG). The two HRSGs are heated from the CTG exhaust gases to generate steam. The generated steam is let in a single steam turbine generator (STG) of  maximum. Resulting peak output is  gross.

Under baseload operation, the output is  gross from each gas-turbine and  gross for the steam-turbine, adding to  gross of which  consumed by the auxiliary equipment, yielding a  net output.

The auxiliary equipment motors are operated at 4,160 volts and the balance power distribution is operated at 480 volts and 277 volts for the lighting loads.

Production 
Russell City Energy Center's production is as follows.

See also

List of power stations in California
Los Esteros Critical Energy Facility, operated by Calpine in San Jose

References

External links
RCEC at the California Energy Commission website
Calpine Corporate website

Energy infrastructure completed in 2013
Buildings and structures in Hayward, California
Natural gas-fired power stations in California
Environment of the San Francisco Bay Area